The karate competition at the 2022 ASEAN University Games was held in Ubon Rachathani, Thailand in the Ban Yang Noi Campus.

2022 ASEAN University Games officially the 20th ASEAN University Games and also known as Ubon Ratchathani 2022 is a regional multi-sport event currently held from 26 July to 6 August 2022 in Ubon Ratchathani, Thailand. Originally planned to take place from 13 to 22 December 2020, it was eventually rescheduled as a result of the COVID-19 pandemic.

Medalists

Kata

Kumite

Men

Women

References

ASEAN University Games
2022 in karate
2022 in Thai sport